All's Well, Ends Well 2012 is a 2012 Hong Kong romantic comedy film directed by Chan Hing-ka and Janet Chun. It is the seventh instalment in the All's Well, Ends Well film series.

Plot
Four men go on a heroic mission to help four women and wind up experiencing a series of mishaps.

Cast
 Donnie Yen as Carl Tam
 Louis Koo as Holland Pang
 Sandra Ng as Chelsia Sung
 Kelly Chen as Julie Sun
 Raymond Wong as Richard Chu
 Yang Mi as Cecilia Chan
 Chapman To as Hugo Wah
 Lynn Hung as Charmaine Tam
 Ronald Cheng as Shalala 
 Karena Ng as Carmen Chu
 Kristal Tin as Daphne Wong
 Lam Suet as Bing-kun
 C-Kwan as Jim
 Vincent Kok as Fattie
 Gong Linna as Xia Fan
 Cherrie Ying as Carl's girlfriend
 Lee Heung-kam as Orphanage head
 Yu Mo-lin as Ho Pik-wan
 Matt Chow as Lawyer Yi
 Manor Chan as Sofia
 Hiro Hayama as Spungehuff Mok
 Singh Hartihan Bitto as Curry
 Michelle Lo as Ms. Lo
 Mak Ling-ling as Mak Ling-ling
 Kelena Poon as Schoolgirl
 Zeny Kwok as Schoolgirl
 Maria Cordero as Chelsia and Daphne's mentor
 Lee Sheung-ching as Billy
 Ciwi Lam as New music star
 James Ho as New music star
 Jeremy Liu as Justin Nam
 6-Wing as Rich Junior
 Wan Chiu as Dubya Dung
 Chui Tien-you as Eye doctor
 Ha Chun-chau as Wedding registrar
 Teresa Carpio as herself
 Peter Lai as himself
 Louis Cheung as himself
 Wilfred Lau as himself
 Patrick Dunn as Tall Guy
 Steven Fung as Snake
 Danny Chan as Helmet
 Alex Cheng as Clayhead
 Tony Hung as Sing
 Wong Yuk-long as Boss Wong
 Andrew Fung as Fung Fung
 Scarlett Wong as Ms. Blanche
 Six Luk as Unlucky driver
 Lam Chak-kwan as Doctor
 May Chan
 Cham Kei-ching as Boss's daughter
 Chan Chi-yan as Mentor's assistant

References

External links

2012 films
2012 romantic comedy films
2010s Cantonese-language films
Hong Kong romantic comedy films
Hong Kong slapstick comedy films
Films about singers
Films about photographers
Films about writers
Films about blind people
Films set in Hong Kong
Films shot in Hong Kong
2010s Hong Kong films